Fighter Squadron 01-004 "Dauphiny" (French language: Escadron de chasse 01-004 "Dauphiné"), or EC 1/4, was a French Air Force squadron, last based at Air Base 116 Luxeuil-Saint Sauveur.

History 

The squadron was founded on 1 July 1947 to carry on the tradition of Fighter Group II/3.  While initially stationed in Koblenz, Germany, the squadron was soon disembarked through Marseilles to participate in operations in French Indochina.  The first mission in that theater was undertaken on 18 September 1947, and the unit continued operations for 16 months until it returned to Europe.  Based in Germany from 1949 to 1961, the squadron was moved to Air Base 116 Luxeuil in France where it would remain until it was disbanded.

In 1972, the squadron was assigned the additional mission of tactical nuclear weapons delivery.  Upon the dissolving of the 4th Wing which the squadron was a part of on 1 September 1991, the squadron was transferred to the direct control of the Strategic Air Forces Command, and within a few years, its primary mission became strategic nuclear strike.  For this it was equipped with the Mirage 2000N armed with the ASMP missile.

The squadron was disbanded on 29 June 2010.

Flights 
 SPA 37 "Charognard"
 SPA 81 "Lévrier"
 SPA 92 "Lion de Belfort"

Bases 
 BA 194 Nha Trang
 BA 136 Friedrichshafen
 BA 136 Bremgarten
 BA 116 Luxeuil-Saint Sauveur

Aircraft 
 1947-1948:  Supermarine Spitfire
 1949: Republic P-47 Thunderbolt
 1949-1953:  de Havilland Vampire
 1954-1957:  Dassault Ouragan
 1957-1967:  Republic F-84 Thunderstreak
 1967-1988:  Dassault Mirage IIIE
 1988-2010:  Dassault Mirage 2000N

See also

 List of French Air and Space Force aircraft squadrons

References 
 

Fighter squadrons of the French Air and Space Force
Military units and formations established in 1947